Events from the year 1475 in France

Incumbents
 Monarch – Louis XI

Events
 29 August – Treaty of Picquigny agreed between Louis XI and Edward IV of England
 Unknown – The siege of Perpignan ends with the city taken by Louis XI's forces after a lengthy siege

See also

References

1470s in France